Dole Island is an island located in the Parker River in Newbury, Massachusetts. The Parker River National Wildlife Refuge is located on it.

References

Islands of Essex County, Massachusetts
Newbury, Massachusetts
River islands of Massachusetts
Uninhabited islands of Massachusetts